Switzerland competed at the 1908 Summer Olympics in London, England.

Results by event

Athletics

Switzerland had one track & field athlete compete in 1908, in the hammer throwing event.  His results are unknown.

Sources
 
 

Nations at the 1908 Summer Olympics
1908
Olympics